Cross-Strait Economic, Trade and Culture Forum, commonly known as the Kuomintang–Chinese Communist Party Forum, was originally proposed by the Kuomintang and the Chinese Communist Party, jointly organized in order to promote cross-strait economic, trade, cultural exchanges dialogue and integration.

Background 
The increased contacts culminated in the 2005 Pan-Blue visits to mainland China, including a meeting between CCP General Secretary Hu Jintao and KMT Chairman Lien Chan in April 2005. They were hailed as the highest level of exchange between the Chinese Communist Party and the Kuomintang since Chiang Kai-shek and Mao Zedong met in Chongqing on 28 August 1945.

Both Kuomintang-Chinese Communist Party hold on the premise of acknowledging the 1992 Consensus, encourage the reopening of talks across the strait. Encourage cooperation in economic exchange and crime fighting, push for two-way direct flights across the strait, Three Links, and agricultural exchange.

History

See also 
 Cross-Strait relations
 Cross-Strait Peace Forum
 Three Links
 Political status of Taiwan
 One Country on Each Side
 Pan-Blue Coalition
 Chinese Civil War
 First United Front
 Second United Front

References 

Cross-Strait relations
Organizations associated with the Chinese Communist Party